Lepo je biti sosed  (It's nice to be neighbours) is a Slovenian television series, which started filming in 2008 and after six seasons, ended May 2011. The broadcast television series called POP TV in the Monday evening slot (20.00), its director was Jemeršič Ven. The first three seasons are copied from the original Slovak. The plot tells about two neighbouring families with good relationships.

The storyline is about two couples, who live across the hallway to each other. The first couple are Žuža (formally Branka), the seller of high-quality products and Beno, the hunter. They have a daughter; Lidija, but she doesn't appear during season 1 nor is she mentioned.  The second couple are Silvika, immigrant from Hungary and Ivo, who is a handyman. They moved into their apartment during the pilot episode, however they knew Beno and Žuža prior to moving in.

During series many recurring characters appeared. The first season recurring characters Vanessa Z and mailman were portrayed by popular singers Anika Horvat and Fredi Miler.

The first-season episodes are 40 minutes long (30 minutes without commercials), however episodes in the following season were 60 minutes long (45 minutes without commercials).  Episodes were shown on a Monday at 20:00 CET.

Cast

List of seasons

List of episodes

Sezona 1

Sezona 2

Sezona 3

Sezona 4

Sezona 5

Sezona 6 

The plot tells about two neighbouring families with good relationships.

Slovenian television series
2000s Slovenian television series
2010s Slovenian television series
2011 Slovenian television series endings
2008 Slovenian television series debuts
Pop (Slovenian TV channel) original programming